Lenny Beckett is an Australian rugby league and rugby union footballer. He is a  member of the Brumbies organisation, noted for his strong defensive game. After making his first two appearances for the Brumbies off the bench in the 2003 semi-final against the Blues at Eden Park, and as a replacement in the 2004 championship winning side Lenny Beckett firstly established himself in the match-day 22 and then the starting XV in 2005.

While attending Westfields Sports High, Beckett played for the Australian Schoolboys rugby league team in 1997 and 1998.

Lenny has put in a series of solid performances that have seen him start the last 7 matches.
Prior to his breakthrough season in 2005, Lenny had been a performer for the Brumby Runners and his club Sydney University. Before joining the Brumbies, Lenny played rugby league in the NRL for the Northern Eagles and Newcastle Knights and is a former Australian Schoolboys rugby league team representative.

Player information
Ht: 1.77m
Wt: 88 kg
DOB: 13/5/80
Position: Wing/Centre
Club: Sydney University
Brumbies (ACT) caps: 10  Points: 0
Brumbies debut: 2003 v Blues, Auckland
S12 Caps: 9       Points: 0
S12 debut: 2003 v Blues, Auckland

References

External links
Lenny Beckett Fan Club

1980 births
Living people
Australian rugby union players
Australian rugby league players
ACT Brumbies players
Newcastle Knights players
Indigenous Australian rugby league players
Northern Eagles players
Manly Warringah Sea Eagles players
Rugby league wingers
Rugby league centres
Rugby league players from Sydney
Rugby union wings
Rugby union centres
Rugby union players from Sydney